The 1922 United States Senate elections in Pennsylvania was held on November 7. Incumbent Republican U.S. Senator David A. Reed, who was appointed in August 1922 to fill the vacancy created by the death of William E. Crow, was elected both to complete the remainder of Crow's term, ending in March 1923, and to a full six-year term in his own right, beginning upon the expiration of Crow's term.

Background
Incumbent United States Senator Philander C. Knox, who was elected in 1916 for a term set to expire in 1923, died on October 12, 1921. Governor of Pennsylvania William Cameron Sproul appointed State Senator William E. Crow to fill the vacant seat until a successor could be duly elected. The special election to complete Knox's term was scheduled for November 7, 1922, simultaneous with the general election to the next term.

Primary elections were held on May 16. Crow was not a candidate in the primary election and died himself on August 2, 1922. Sproul appointed David A. Reed, who by then had been nominated by the Republican Party for both elections, to complete the unexpired term pending the results of the special election.

Republican primary

Candidates
John C. Lowry
David A. Reed, Pittsburgh attorney and World War I field artillery Major

Withdrew
William J. Burke, U.S. Representative from Pittsburgh (to run in the special election to complete Boies Penrose's term)

Special primary

Regular primary

Special election

Candidates
David A. Reed, Pittsburgh attorney and interim U.S. Senator (Republican)
Rachel C. Robinson (Prohibition)
William J. Van Essen (Socialist)

Results

Regular election

Candidates
William J. Burke, U.S. Representative from Pittsburgh (representing Pennsylvania at-large) (Progressive)
David A. Reed, Pittsburgh attorney and interim U.S. Senator (Republican)
Rachel C. Robinson (Prohibition)
Charles J. Schoales (Single Tax)
Charles Sehl (Socialist)
Samuel E. Shull (Democratic)

Results

References

Pennsylvania
1922
Pennsylvania 1922
United States Senate 1922
Pennsylvania 1922
1922 Pennsylvania elections